The South Georgia and South Sandwich Islands Gazette is the government gazette of South Georgia and the South Sandwich Islands. It is published in Stanley in the Falkland Islands.

The Gazette is published under provisions contained in The South Georgia and South Sandwich Islands Order 1985 which brought the territory into existence. The area covered by the territory had previously been known as the Falkland Islands Dependencies.

See also
List of British colonial gazettes

References

External links
Official website

South Georgia and the South Sandwich Islands culture
Government of South Georgia and the South Sandwich Islands
British colonial gazettes
Publications with year of establishment missing